Hoggatt may refer to:

, Casablanca-class escort carrier of the United States Navy
Verner Emil Hoggatt, Jr. (1921–1980), American mathematician
Wilford Bacon Hoggatt (1865–1938), American naval officer and businessman, sixth Governor of the District of Alaska

See also
Hogget (disambiguation)